Mongolian armour has a long history. Mongol armour drew its influence from Chinese, Middle Eastern, and Central Asian styles. Most Mongolian armour was of scale and lamellar variety. Most armour was made of hardened leather and iron, laced together onto a fabric backing, sometimes silk. Mail armour was also sometimes used, but was rare, probably due to its weight and difficulty to repair. Mongol archers demanded the armour be light enough so that when riding, it didn't interfere with their mobility. It is also possible that the Mongol armour lacked mail and was generally lighter than its counterparts to the East and West because the nomadic habits of the Mongols were not conducive to the labour-intensive practices and permanent facilities necessary for making mail or large plates.  Sometimes arm protection was removed so that a rider could draw their bow more easily. The helmet was made of mostly iron, but leather and other materials were also used. Lamellar armour was also used by the countries that were affected by the invasion of the Mongols worldwide, including the conquest of China and the Middle East. This is especially shown by Tamerlane, a debatably Mongol warlord of the 15th century that used lamellar armour consistently with his cavalry, and garbed himself and his men in Mongolian armour during war.

Genghis Khan was once said to have issued all his horsemen with silk vests, as an arrow hitting silk does not break the silk but ends up embedding the arrow in the flesh wrapped in silk, allowing the arrow to be removed by gently teasing the silk open. This is opposed to the usual method of removing barbed arrows—cutting them out, or pushing them right through an injured limb and out of the other side. These silk vests functioned much like the padded armour used by European and Byzantine soldiers of the era, such as the gambeson.

Gallery

References

See also 
 Laminar armour

East Asian armour
Military equipment of Mongolia
Military history of Mongolia